Kienholz is a surname, and a place name. It may refer to:

People
 Edward Kienholz (1927–1994), American installation artist and sculptor, was married to Nancy Reddin Kienholz
 Nancy Reddin Kienholz (1943–2019), American  mixed media artist, was married to Edward Kienholz
 Willis Kienholz (1875–1958), American  football player and coach

Places
A settlement in the Swiss municipality of Brienz